Lophophelma rubroviridata is a moth of the family Geometridae first described by William Warren in 1898. It is found on Peninsular Malaysia, Sumatra and Borneo. The habitat consists of lower and upper montane forests.

Adults have pale ochreous-brown wings, traversed by strongly defined, zigzag black fasciae with a distinctive bluish tinge. The underside is pale yellowish buff with submarginal bands that are relatively even in width and run well clear of the margin.

References

Moths described in 1898
Pseudoterpnini